Iptameni Pagodromi Athinai ("flying ice-skaters Athens") is an ice hockey team in Athens, Greece. They play in the Greek Ice Hockey Championship.

History
The club was founded in 1984, and joined the newly started Greek Championship in 1989. They finished as runner-up, losing to Aris Saloniki, in the 1989, 1990, and 1991 seasons. Their breakthrough was in 1992, when they won the Greek Championship for the first time. Pagodromoi won the championship again in 1993. After that Greek hockey fell on financial troubles, and the championship was not held again until 2000.

The championship started up again in 2000, and Pagodromoi was victorious. The championship was not held again until the 2007-08 season.

In the 2008 season, they finished first in the standings with a 5-0-0 record, and won the playoff championship in two games over Albatros Athen. Pagodromoi capped another perfect season in 2009, going 6-0-0 in the regular season, and 3-0-0 in the round-robin playoff.

In 2009-10, they went 8-0-0, and won the league title, as there were no playoffs held that season. The club did not participate during the 2010-11 season. In 2013, again they were victorious with a perfect 10-0-0, having 129 goals for versus only 13 goals against.

Season-by-season record
2013 - 1st
2012 - no championship
2011 - did not participate due to the fact that the Federation President did not allow them.
2010 - 1st
2009 - 1st
2008 - 1st
2001-2007 - no championship
2000 - 1st
1994-1999 - no championship
1993 - 1st
1992 - 1st
1991 - 2nd
1990 - 2nd
1989 - 2nd

External links
Club profile on Eurohockey.net

Ice hockey teams in Greece
1994 establishments in Greece
Sports clubs in Athens